Muddula Mogudu is a 1997 Indian Telugu-language drama film produced by K. Nageswara Rao, presented by Kaikala Satyanayana and directed by A. Kodandarami Reddy. It stars Nandamuri Balakrishna, Meena, Ravali, and music composed by Koti. The film was released on 25 April 1997.

Plot
Vamsi is an energetic man who claims to be the reincarnation of Salim, the son of 16th-century Mughal Emperor Akbar. He has separated from his lover Anarkali by walling her up and now stalks her under the guise of Sirisha. Sirisha makes fun of him, but eventually falls in love with him after he self-immolates. Shakuntala Devi, Sirisha's vain and scheming mother, discovers their relationship through her brother Gnaneswara Rao, who wants to pair Sirisha with his son Giri. Shakuntala slanders Vamsi's family and separates the couple. 

Twenty years ago, Shakuntala arranged a marriage between her son Seshu Babu and Gnaneswara Rao's daughter. However, Seshu Babu fell in love with Vamsi's sister, Padmavati, and rejected his fiancée. Gnaneswara Rao tried to kill Padmavati, who died giving birth to a daughter, Sarada. Parvatamma, Vamsi's mother, asks him to marry Sarada, but he refuses and declares his love for Sirisha. Shakuntala agrees to Vamsi's marriage to Sirisha on the condition that she inherits her wealth.

After the wedding night, Vamsi kicks Sirisha out and gives her his property. When asked why he did it, he remains silent. Sirisha then forges fake certificates claiming that she is a virgin and that Vamsi is impotent. Vamsi remains patient, and when Sirisha becomes pregnant, he exposes Shakuntala's evil deeds and announces his marriage to Sarada. Sirisha attempts suicide, but Vamsi rescues her and forgives Shakuntala. The movie ends with Vamsi and Sirisha reuniting.

Cast 

Nandamuri Balakrishna as Vamsi
Meena as Sirisha
Ravali as Sarada & Padmavathi
Satyanayana as Bhaskar Rao
Pundarikakshaiah as Vamsi's Uncle
Kota Srinivasa Rao as Gnaneswara Rao
Chalapathi Rao as Vamsi's Uncle
Srihari as Rowdy
Brahmanandam as Saidulu
Sudhakar as Giri
Mallikarjuna Rao as Saidulu's father-in-law
Raj Kumar as Seshu Babu
Raja Ravindra as bride
Vinod as Senadhipathi
Suthi Velu as Saidulu's grandfather
Uttej as Hari
Jenny as Police Inspector
Lakshmi as Shakunthala Devi
Annapurna as Parvatamma
Annuja as Roja
Ragini as Pooja
Krishnaveni
Radhabai as Sirisha's grandmother
Y. Vijaya as Gallipeta Bujji

Soundtrack

Music composed by Koti. Music released on Shiva Musicals Company.

Reception 
The film was reviewed by Zamin Ryot. A critic from Andhra Today opined that "Although a story with a well tested theme and plot, Kodandarami Reddy's skillful & imaginative direction keep the audience's interest".

References

External links 
 

1990s Telugu-language films
1997 films
Films directed by A. Kodandarami Reddy
Films scored by Koti
Films with screenplays by Posani Krishna Murali
Indian drama films